Hirdman is a Scandinavian surname, see Hird#Hirdman. Notable people with the surname include: 

Sven Hirdman (born 1939), Swedish diplomat
Yvonne Hirdman (born 1943), Swedish historian

Swedish-language surnames